Oda of Saxony (877 – aft. 952) was a Saxon princess. She was the daughter of Otto I, Duke of Saxony (830/840 – 912) and Hedwiga of Babenberg. She married King Zwentibold of Lotharingia and at his death in August 900 (when Oda must have been 23), she contracted a second marriage with Count Gerhard I of Metz. From this union were born:

Wigfried, abbot of St. Ursula in Cologne, and then archbishop of Cologne from 924 to 953.
Oda (Uda) of Metz (d. 10 Apr 963), married Gozlin, Count of Bidgau and Methingau (d. 942).
A daughter of name unknown.
Godfrey, count of the Jülichgau.

References

Sources

877 births
10th-century deaths
Daughters of monarchs